Schlusser pronounced (Skloosher) is a census-designated place (CDP) in North Middleton and Middlesex townships, Cumberland County, Pennsylvania, United States. The population was 5,265 at the 2010 census. It is part of the Harrisburg–Carlisle Metropolitan Statistical Area.

Geography
Schlusser is located directly northeast of Carlisle, the county seat, at  (40.238528, -77.183573), in eastern North Middleton Township and western Middlesex Township. Conodoguinet Creek, a tributary of the Susquehanna River, flows through the middle of the CDP.

Demographics
As of the census of 2000, there were 4,750 people, 1,953 households, and 1,384 families residing in the CDP. The population density was 1,616.4 people per square mile (623.8/km). There were 2,039 housing units at an average density of 693.9/sq mi (267.8/km). The racial makeup of the CDP was 92.34% White, 3.35% African American, 0.23% Native American, 2.15% Asian, 0.21% Pacific Islander, 0.69% from other races, and 1.03% from two or more races. Hispanic or Latino of any race were 1.66% of the population.

There were 1,953 households, out of which 31.4% had children under the age of 18 living with them, 58.3% were married couples living together, 9.5% had a female householder with no husband present, and 29.1% were non-families. 23.7% of all households were made up of individuals, and 7.2% had someone living alone who was 65 years of age or older. The average household size was 2.43 and the average family size was 2.86.

In the CDP, the population was spread out, with 22.5% under the age of 18, 7.4% from 18 to 24, 31.6% from 25 to 44, 27.1% from 45 to 64, and 11.5% who were 65 years of age or older. The median age was 38 years. For every 100 females, there were 92.4 males. For every 100 females age 18 and over, there were 90.3 males.

The median income for a household in the CDP was $49,299, and the median income for a family was $55,616. Males had a median income of $36,279 versus $28,099 for females. The per capita income for the CDP was $22,084. About 1.2% of families and 2.0% of the population were below the poverty line, including 2.1% of those under age 18 and 4.2% of those age 65 or over.

References

Harrisburg–Carlisle metropolitan statistical area
Census-designated places in Cumberland County, Pennsylvania
Census-designated places in Pennsylvania